Doug Lussenhop (born March 8, 1973), known professionally as DJ Douggpound, is an American musician, video editor, and comedian. Doug is best known as the editor for Tim and Eric Awesome Show, Great Job!, that features his trademark editing style, which the show is known for. Doug edited and acted in many Tim & Eric projects including Tom Goes to the Mayor, Tim and Eric Nite Live, and their feature film, Tim and Eric's Billion Dollar Movie.

Early life 
Doug was born and raised in Darien, Illinois. His early work includes collaborating with Eric Fensler in the creation of his GI Joe PSA's parodies. Doug attended the College of DuPage and Columbia College Chicago where he studied film. After college Doug and David Dobie founded Heaven Gallery, a small art gallery in Chicago. During this time, Doug was a creator of video art, even having his work showcased at MoMA PS1 in New York.

Television career 
Doug has had a lengthy career in television, both as an editor and a comedy writer. Notable programs include Tim and Eric Awesome Show, Great Job!, The Eric Andre Show, and Portlandia. In 2015, Doug co-developed and co-wrote with Daniel Weidenfeld, an 11-minute live-action pilot for Adult Swim created by Weidenfeld and starring himself, called The Pound Hole.

Comedy projects 
The Poundcast

In 2007, Doug created and starred in "The Poundcast" a sketch series that aired on SuperDeluxe.com. The series featured surreal sketches, each with a musical theme.

Pound House

In 2013, Doug created and starred in the web series "Pound House", alongside frequent collaborator Brent Weinbach. The series was produced by Jash, and was filmed largely at Doug's Los Angeles home.

2 Wet Crew

As the comedy trio "2 Wet Crew" Doug Lussenhop, Mikey Kampmann, and Jay Weingarten create online sketches and host a live comedy show in Los Angeles.

Music albums 
Along with creating original music for television programs, Doug is a self-described "Joke DJ" and creates songs that combine music and comedy. Doug was the opening act for Tim & Eric during their various international tours. In 2009, Lussenhop released an original album of songs called Pound It, many of which had been created for sketches in his Poundcast series.

Lussenhop has recorded several albums that have been released on labels Gnar Tapes, Kerchow Records, and SBI Press. His albums include Pound It, Up Our Holes, Nickels Get Jelly, The Archives Volume Two, Videovember, and The Body Tight Workout.

Podcasting 
Along with fellow comedians Neal Brennan and Moshe Kasher, Doug cohosted The Champs podcast, where Lussenhop interrupted and guided the interviews with well-timed musical cues, and audio drops. After departing from The Champs, Lussenhop started his own podcast, The Poundcast which he hosts with Brent Weinbach. Lussenhop is also a co-host of the podcast Office Hours with Tim Heidecker along with Vic Berger.

References

External links
 
 

1973 births
Living people
American male musicians
American male voice actors